Bangladesh Institute of Research and Training on Applied Nutrition is a research and training institute under the Ministry of Agriculture on Applied Nutrition. Md. Abdul Wadud is the present Executive Director of Bangladesh Institute of Research and Training on Applied Nutrition.

History
National Professor Late Dr. Md. Ibrahim has started a project namely ‘Applied Nutrition Project’ in 1968 at Jurain, Demra in order to improve public health as well as scale up of the nutritional status of the people through applied nutritional sensitive program. The main objective of the project was to solve the nutritional problem of self realization. Based on its success, the project was renamed as Bangladesh Institute of Research and Training on Applied Nutrition (BIRTAN) based in Dhaka under the Ministry of Agriculture. Later, BIRTAN continued as an associated organ of Bangladesh Agriculture Research Council (BARC) from 1980 to 1993 and in 1994 it act an autonomous body and its activities were expanded to other parts of the country through establishing 4 regional centers. In 2012, Bangladesh Institute of Research and Training on Applied Nutrition (BIRTAN) Act, 2012 passed in the National Parliament and subsequently Bangladesh Institute of Research and Training on Applied Nutrition (BIRTAN) (Officers and Staff) Service Regulation, 2016 was also formulated and published the Bangladesh Gazette on 11 July 2016. Main objectives for the establishment of BIRTAN is to aware all segmenting of the people about the importance of food based nutrition primarily through training and research. Training includes human resource development on food based nutrition through trainers training and to create awareness among the mass people of the society. BIRTAN also participate in agricultural /food fairs, and create awareness through mass media. BIRTAN conduct research about the nutritional status of different segment of the people in different areas, knowledge about food based nutrition, dietary pattern, water, sanitation and hygiene (WASH), calorie intake, balanced diet, biofortification of food etc.

Activity
According to the Bangladesh Institute of Research and Training on Applied Nutrition (BIRTAN) Act, 2012 BIRTAN will perform the following activities:

- To take and implement research and development activities on food based nutrition (applied nutrition) with a view to increasing the nutrition level of the people;

- To provide training on food nutrition for the officers of the Government and non-government organizations, teachers of various educational institutes, local government representatives,

farmers and others and create awareness among them regarding the nutrition related policies;

- To invent technology and conduct research on sustaining pre and post losses of food grains collection and food process and preservation;

- To conduct research on functional food and medical plants and to increase production thereof, include them in their daily food items and enhance awareness thereof;

- To analyse, ascertain and update the nutrition value of food grains, and make or give assistance to make list of daily necessary food items;

- To specify district, upzilla or agro-ecological zone-basis malnutrition related health problem and exchange of information received with the concerned ministry of organization for

ensuring the safety of food and nutrition;

- To conduct research on harmful effect of chemical or arsenic used in food chain and enhance consumer awareness of it;

- To increase awareness of nutrition and health of the people of all levels by participating in the agriculture-fair, world food day, nutrition week, livestock fair, fish fair, environment day,

etc. including publishing in various public and electronic media;

- To make measures for research and development activities separately and jointly, with the concerned research institution, for inventing much nutritious food items, varieties and

technologies;

- To create skilled human resource on nutrition by implementing certificate and diploma course on applied nutrition and food science;

References

2012 establishments in Bangladesh
Organisations based in Narayanganj